The 1920 Marshall Thundering Herd football team represented Marshall College (now Marshall University) in the 1920 college football season. Marshall posted a winless 0–8 record, being outscored by its opposition 0–247.  Home games were played on a campus field called "Central Field" which is presently Campus Commons.

Schedule

References

Marshall
Marshall Thundering Herd football seasons
College football winless seasons
Marshall Thundering Herd football